Samoan Americans are Americans of Samoan origin, including those who emigrated from the United States Territory of American Samoa and immigrants from the Independent State of Samoa to the United States. Samoan Americans are Pacific Islanders in the United States Census, and are the second largest Pacific Islander group in the U.S., after Native Hawaiians.

American Samoa has been an unincorporated territory of the United States since 1900, and Samoa, formally known as the Independent State of Samoa and known as Western Samoa until 1997, is an independent nation that gained its independence from New Zealand in 1962. American Samoa(which is under the jurisdiction of the United States of America) and Samoa together make up the Samoan Islands, an archipelago that covers 1,170 sq mi (3,030 km2). Like Native Hawaiians, the Samoans arrived on the mainland US in the 19th century serving in the US armed forces, fishermen and later worked as agricultural laborers and factory workers.

As per 2021 U.S. Census estimates, there are over 240,000 people of Samoan descent living in the United States, including those of partial ancestry, which is roughly over the population of the Independent State of Samoa, as of 2021. Honolulu, Hawaii, has the largest Samoan population of over 12,000 making up over 2% of the city's population. There are large Samoan communities in Greater Los Angeles, Orange County, California, San Francisco Bay Area, and Greater San Diego counties in the state of California. Other states with cities and towns with significant communities are Alaska,  Arizona, Missouri, Oregon, Nevada, Texas, Utah, and Washington.

History

Migration from Samoan Islands to the United States began in the 19th century. A small group of Samoans were part of the first Mormon Polynesian colony in the U.S., which was founded in Utah in 1889 and consisted of Samoans, Hawaiian natives, Tahitians, and Maori people.

American Samoa officially became a U.S. territory in 1900 with the Treaty of Cession of Tutuila and in 1904 with the Treaty of Cession of Manu'a.

In the 1920s a small group of Mormons from American Samoa emigrated to the modern United States. They were brought by American Mormons to  
Laie, Hawaii to assist in building the Mormon Temple of this place. The community grew over the decade and in 1929 there were already 125 American Samoans living in Laie, but the Samoan migration to Hawaii fell in the following years. It was probably due to the crash of 29, the loss of an important rice field for the community, and the Second World War. In the second half of the 1940s about 300 mostly military families of American Samoans emigrated to the United States specifically to Hawaii. 

In 1951, nearly 1,000 American Samoans linked with the army (i.e. military personnel and their relatives) migrated to the Honolulu's American bases by accepting an invitation from the US Navy (which had left its bases in the Pago Pago city, as American Samoa began to be administered by the U.S. Department of the Interior) so that the Marines could continue working for the Navy. However, many of them later migrated to California (in 1952).

In 1952 the natives of American Samoa become U.S. nationals, although not American citizens, through the Immigration and Nationality Act of 1952. This encouraged Samoan emigration to the United States and during the rest of the decade nearly four thousand Samoans migrated to the U.S., mostly to California and Hawaii. Many more Samoans migrated to the United States in the 1960s, surpassing those who emigrated in the previous decade. In fact, the largest Samoan migration to the U.S. occurred at this time (mainly at the beginning of the decade).  After 1965 increased migration from Samoa republic. At this time, many Samoans serving in the US military emigrated to be stationed in Hawaii. In the 1970s over 7,540 Western Samoans emigrated to the United States, although the number of people from American Samoa who emigrated to the U.S. is unknown.

In 1972, the number of American Samoans living in the United States exceeded the Samoan population in American Samoa, and California took the place of Tutuila as the main Samoan-populated region. In 1980 over 22,000 Samoa-born lived in the U.S., mostly of Western Samoa (more than 13,200), while 9,300 were from American Samoa.

Demographics
According to 2021 U.S. Census Bureau estimates, there were 243,682 Samoan people in the United States stateside population, including those who have partial Samoan ancestry. The Samoan American community consists in Americans of both American Samoan and Western Samoan descent.

California
63,000 people of Samoan origin reside in California, meaning almost one-third of the Samoan population in the U.S. lives in California. 0.2% of California's population is of Samoan descent. The number of those who identify as Samoan alone is 36,443. The percentages and numbers of Samoan people residing in cities listed below vary from 2015 to 2018, according to the "5-Year Estimates Detailed Tables" from the U.S. Census Bureau.

Southern California
Carson (1.8-2.2%), Compton (0.3-0.5%), and Long Beach (0.7-0.8%), and Paramount (0.7-1%) in Los Angeles County, Oceanside (0.5-0.6%) in San Diego County, and Twentynine Palms (0.9-1.1%) in San Bernardino County have among the highest concentration of Samoans in Southern California, which include those of partial ancestry. Also in San Diego, the very first Samoan church in the entire United States, was founded in 1955 by Rev. Suitonu Galea'i. From there, multiple Samoan churches throughout California branched from the First Samoan Congregational Christian Church of San Diego. There are Samoan communities enumerating several hundred in Moreno Valley (300 to 500) and San Bernardino (400), at least 0.2% of the city’s populations.

Northern California
The public housing communities in the Bayview-Hunters Point, Potrero Hill, and Visitacion Valley neighborhoods in San Francisco are home to much of the city’s Samoan community. As per the 2015-18 estimates, San Francisco is 0.2-0.3% Samoan (1,807-2,262 residents). The 2018 estimate of the number of Samoans in San Francisco is a decrease from the 2000 reported number of Samoans, which was 2,311 (which did not account for people who reported to be part Samoan).  In the East Bay Area, San Leandro is home to a sizable Samoan community (0.4%-0.6%), as well as in Daly City (0.4-0.9%), East Palo Alto (1.2-1.3%), and Hayward (0.6%-0.9%). In Daly City, Samoan restaurants and businesses are located off Geneva Avenue. In 1972, the First Samoan Congregational Church of San Jose was founded by Rev. Felix T. and Molly T. Ava Molifua, affiliated with Northern California UCC. San Jose has over 3,000 Samoans in residence (0.3%).

In the Central Valley and inland California, where compared to the Bay Area has a slightly smaller percentage of Samoans, higher populations are commonly found in the areas of Modesto (0.2%), Sacramento, and Stockton. The city of Sacramento has over 1,800 to 2,200 Samoans, about 0.4% of its population.

In Central California, Samoan Americans are concentrated in Monterey County, which was home to a U.S. Army base, Fort Ord, which closed in 1994. The populations are concentrated in Marina (0.8-1%) and Seaside (0.4%-0.9%).

Other Western U.S.

Oregon and Washington
The Seattle−Tacoma, Washington area is also home to a sizable Samoan community, especially in the cities of Kent (1.5%), Renton (1%), Federal Way (1.6%), SeaTac (2.9%), and White Center (3.2%). Seattle has 1,500 Samoans, 0.2% of the city's population. The First Samoan Christian Congregational Church in the Washington state was established in 1964 in southeast Seattle, where Samoans settled in the Pacific Northwest. The south Seattle neighborhoods of Columbia City and Rainier Valley have had sizeable Samoan communities since the 1960s and 1970s. Nearly 6,000 people of their descendants reside in Pierce County, Washington, making up 0.7% of the county's population. Tacoma is home to 1,800 Samoans, making up nearly one percent of the city's population.

The Dalles, Oregon has a Samoan community of nearly 200 Samoan people, making up 1.3% of the city's population.

Utah and other western U.S.
Utah statewide is 0.6% Samoan including those with some non-Samoan ancestry, and 0.3% are those who identify as Samoan alone. Utah has a history of Samoan immigration dating back to the late 1800s, due to them taking up Mormonism which was preached and influenced to them by missionairies who had come to Polynesian islands. Utah's Mormon community had housing and services for some Polynesian immigrants, which also included Tongans and Maori. Salt Lake City, Utah is home to 1,500 Samoan-origin people, 0.7% of the city's population. Salt Lake County cities such as Kearns (2%), Taylorsville (1.5%), and West Valley City (1.8%) having above average proportions of Samoan people for Utah. There is a sizable Samoan community in Utah County, specifically Provo, which is at least 0.3% Samoan.

There is a Samoan community in Colorado Springs, Colorado of 430 people (0.1%), and Lawton, Oklahoma (0.3%), in which Comanche County, Oklahoma is at least 0.6% Pacific Islander (2010), mainly Samoan.

Las Vegas, Nevada is home to over 1,500 Samoans, 0.2% of the city's population.

Alaska and Hawaii
Outside the mainland U.S., many Samoan Americans have settled in Hawaii and Alaska. About 2.8% of Hawaiian residents are of Samoan descent, with 1.3% having full Samoan ancestry. Many live on the island of Oahu. Linapuni Street, especially the Kuhio Park Terrace apartments in Honolulu, has the highest concentration of Samoans of any residential area in Hawaii, at 37% of residents. Central Palolo has the highest percentage of any Hawaiian tract, with 4% having a Samoan background. The Oahu town of Laie has 1,380 Samoan Americans,  about 21% of the town, one of the highest concentration of Samoan Americas of any town or city in the U.S.

Two percent of people in the city of Anchorage, Alaska are of Samoan descent, with nearly 6,000 living in the city. Alaska has a relatively high proportion of them, comprising about 0.8% of the state's population.

Midwest and South
In the Midwest, a significant Samoan community is in Independence, Missouri, where around 1,000 Samoan people reside (0.9% of the city). In nearby Kansas City, Missouri there lives 340 Samoans, which is 0.1% of the city's population.

In the Eastern United States and Southeastern United States, Samoan communities exist in Fayetteville, North Carolina and Clarksville, Tennessee. There are 365 Samoan-origin people in Prince William County, Virginia, and a Samoan church in Alexandria. 

There is a community of Samoans in Liberty County, Georgia.

In Texas, there is a Samoan community prominent in the Dallas-Fort Worth suburb of Euless (0.5%), and a Samoan church in the city of Killeen (0.3%).

Military
Significant numbers of Samoan Americans serve in the U.S. Military. American Samoa has the highest rate of military enlistment of any state or territory.

Sports
American football is the most popular sport in American Samoa. Per capita, the Samoan Islands have produced the highest number of National Football League players. In 2010, it was estimated that a boy born to Samoan parents is 56 times more likely to get into the NFL than any other boy in America.

Notable people

Entertainment
 Queen Muhammad Ali, film director
 Cooper Andrews, actor
 Nephi Hannemann, actor
 Dwayne Johnson, actor, professional wrestler
 Mark Kanemura, dancer
 Tony Meredith, dancer, choreographer
 Josefa Moe, entertainer, celebrity
 Tanoai Reed, stunt performer, actor

Music
 Alex Aiono, singer, YouTuber
 Boo-Yaa T.R.I.B.E., hip hop group
 Drew Deezy, rapper
 Cheryl Deserée, singer-songwriter
 Dinah Jane, singer; member of Fifth Harmony
 Taimane Gardner, ukulele player, composer
 Maryanne Ito, soul singer
 Bunny Michael, musician, rapper
 Mavis Rivers, jazz singer
 Tedashii, Christian hip hop artist
 Tenelle, singer-songwriter

Politics, law and government

 Uluao Jr Aumavae, politician; 2nd Chief Equity Officer Anchorage Alaska (2020–2024)
 Tulsi Gabbard, politician; U.S. Representative for Hawaii's 2nd congressional district (2013–2021)
 Mike Gabbard, politician, member of the Hawaii State Senate
 Mufi Hannemann, politician; 12th Mayor of Honolulu (2005–2010)
 Bode Uale, Hawaii state court judge

Sports
 American football

 Al Afalava
 C. J. Ah You
 Harland Ah You
 Tui Alailefaleula
 Clifton Alapa
 Tyson Alualu
 Brad Anae
 Robert Anae
 Charley Ane
 Charlie Ane
 Donovan Arp
 Devin Asiasi
 Isaac Asiata
 Matt Asiata
 Sal Aunese
 Kahlil Bell
 Kendrick Bourne
 Inoke Breckterfield
 Algie Brown
 DeForest Buckner
 Colby Cameron
 Jordan Cameron
 Suʻa Cravens
 Scott Crichton
 Hershel Dennis
 Luther Elliss
 Justin Ena
 DeQuin Evans
 Nuʻu Faʻaola
 Jonathan Fanene
 Eletise Fiatoa
 Malcom Floyd
 Fou Fonoti
 Toniu Fonoti
 Chris Fuamatu-Maʻafala
 Setema Gali
 Randall Goforth
 Micah Hannemann
 Wayne Hunter
 Nate Ilaoa
 Junior Ioane
 Sale Isaia
 Senio Kelemete
 Pat Kesi
 Hauʻoli Kikaha
 Glen Kozlowski
 Mike Kozlowski
 Jake Kuresa
 Shawn Lauvao
 Kili Lefotu
 Sefo Liufau
 Joe Lobendahn
 Al Lolotai
 Malaefou MacKenzie
 Kaluka Maiava
 Damien Mama
 Frank Manumaleuga
 Brandon Manumaleuna
 Vince Manuwai
 Marcus Mariota
 Jeremiah Masoli
 Hercules Mataʻafa
 Fred Matua
 Rey Maualuga
 Josh Mauga
 Itula Mili
 Roy Miller
 Edwin Mulitalo
 Louis Murphy
 Kai Nacua
 Jim Nicholson
 Ken Niumatalolo
 Al Noga
 Niko Noga
 Pete Noga
 Chris Owusu
 Tenny Palepoi
 Joe Paopao
 David Parry
 Saul Patu
 Domata Peko
 Kyle Peko
 Tupe Peko
 Ropati Pitoitua
 Kennedy Polamalu
 Troy Polamalu
 Pulu Poumele
 Jeremiah Poutasi
 Tavita Pritchard
 Mike Purcell
 Keilani Ricketts
 Jason Rivers
 Blaine Saipaia
 Dan Saleaumua
 Dru Samia
 Brashton Satele
 Samson Satele
 Brian Schwenke
 Kona Schwenke
 Ian Seau
 Junior Seau
 Mike Sellers
 Isaac Seumalo
 Danny Shelton
 Sealver Siliga
 Mana Silva
 JuJu Smith-Schuster
 Brian Soi
 Paul Soliai
 Vic Soʻoto
 Xavier Suʻa-Filo
 Nicky Sualua
 Frank Summers
 Alameda Taʻamu
 Ed Taʻamu
 Tua Tagovailoa
 Nuʻu Tafisi
 Kelly Talavou
 Lofa Tatupu
 Vai Taua
 Will Taʻufoʻou
 Junior Tautalatasi
 Terry Tautolo
 Sae Tautu
 J. R. Tavai
 Daniel Teʻo-Nesheim
 Manti Teʻo
 Martin Tevaseu
 Jack Thompson
 D. J. Tialavea
 John Timu
 Pisa Tinoisamoa
 Albert Toeaina
 Pago Togafau
 Levine Toilolo
 Mao Tosi
 Charles Tuaau
 Esera Tuaolo
 Natu Tuatagaloa
 Marques Tuiasosopo
 Peter Tuiasosopo
 Lavasier Tuinei
 Mark Tuinei
 Van Tuinei
 Joe Tuipala
 Willie Tuitama
 Maugaula Tuitele
 Andria Tupola
 Mike Ulufale
 Morris Unutoa
 Jeremiah Valoaga
 Lenny Vandermade
 Larry Warford
 Albert Wilson

 Athletics
 Jeremy Dodson, sprints
 Gary Fanelli, long-distance
 Anthony Leiato, shot put
 Baseball
 Benny Agbayani
 Isiah Kiner-Falefa
 Sean Manaea
 Basketball
 Rashaun Broadus
 James Johnson
 Dion Prewster
 Wally Rank
 Peyton Siva
 Mekeli Wesley
 Wendell White
 Mixed martial arts
 Andre Fili
 Kendall Grove
 Max Holloway
 Raquel Paʻaluhi

 Professional wrestling
 Afa Anoaʻi
 Afa Anoaʻi Jr.
 Lloyd Anoaʻi
 Vanessa Borne
 Deuce
 Emily Dole
 Sam Fatu
 Nia Jax
 Dwayne Johnson
 Sean Maluta
 Roman Reigns
 Rikishi
 Rosey
 Samoa Joe
 Samu
 Tamina Snuka
 Umaga
 The Usos
 Yokozuna

 Rugby
 Thretton Palamo, union
 Psalm Wooching, union
 Swimming
 Virginia Farmer
 Stewart Glenister
 Robin Leamy
 Other
 Robyn Ah Mow-Santos, volleyball
 Mariah Bullock, soccer
 Tony Finau, golf
 Konishiki Yasokichi, sumo
 Greg Louganis, diving
 Garrett Muagututia, volleyball
 Fua Logo Tavui, sailing

Other
 Matt Keikoan, poker player
 Alema Leota, Robin Hood
 Caroline Sinavaiana-Gabbard, writer, literature professor

See also
 Samoan Australians
 Samoan New Zealanders
 Samoa - United States relations
 Native Hawaiians

References

External links

American people of Samoan descent
Oceanian American
Pacific Islands American
Polynesian American